The Commission for the Implementation of the Constitution (CIC) of Kenya is a government Commission established under the Constitution of Kenya to ensure smooth implementation of the 2010 Constitution of Kenya.

Roles
The commission's roles include:
 Monitor, facilitate and oversee the development of legislation and administrative procedures required to implement the Constitution
 Co-ordinate with the Attorney-General and the Kenya Law Reform Commission in preparing, for tabling in Parliament, the legislation required to implement the Constitution
 Report regularly to the Constitutional Implementation Oversight Committee on:
 progress in the implementation of the Constitution
 Any impediments to its implementation
 Work with each constitutional commission to ensure that the letter and spirit of the Constitution is respected.

Lifetime of the Commissions
The Commission will be dissolved five years after it is established or when the Constitution is fully implementation - whichever is sooner. Full implementation will be determined by Parliament but it may, by resolution, extend the commission's life.

Membership 
The current membership of the Commission is as follows:
 Charles Nyachae (Chairman)
 Dr. Elizabeth Muli
 Dr. Florence Omosa
 Philemon Mwaisaka
 Dr. Ibrahim M. Ali
 Catherine Muyeka Mumma
 Kamotho Waiganjo
 Prof. Peter Wanyande
 Imaana Kibaaya Laibuta

References

External links 
 'Official Site'

Politics of Kenya
Government agencies of Kenya
2012 in Kenya
Law of Kenya
Kenya articles by importance